The serial verb construction, also known as (verb) serialization or verb stacking, is a syntactic phenomenon in which two or more verbs or verb phrases are strung together in a single clause. It is a common feature of many African, Asian and New Guinean languages. Serial verb constructions are often described as coding a single event; they can also be used to indicate concurrent or causally-related events.

Uses 
The terms "serial verbs", "serialization", etc. are used by different authors to denote somewhat different sets of constructions. There are also differences in how the constructions are analyzed, in terms of both syntax and semantics.

In general, a structure described as a serial verb construction will consist either of two (or possibly more) consecutive verbs or of two or more consecutive verb phrases in which each verb may have its own object and possibly other modifiers. There will usually be no marking, by means of affixes or subordinating conjunctions, that one verb is dependent on the other, and they will not be linked by coordinating conjunctions. Some linguists insist that serial verbs cannot be dependent on each other; however, if a language does not mark dependent verbs with affixation, it can be hard to determine whether any dependency relation exists when verbs appear in sequence.

Serial verbs normally denote actions that are closely connected and can be considered to be part of the same event. They may be actions taking place simultaneously, or one may represent the cause, purpose or result of the other. In most cases, the serial verbs in a sequence are understood to share the same subject.

Certain expressions resembling serial verb construction are found in English (surviving from Early Modern English), such as let's go eat and come live with me. In such constructions, the second verb would normally be regarded as a bare infinitive (and can generally be replaced by a "full" infinitive by the insertion of to before it).

Examples with consecutive verbs 

The next sentence in Persian contains 29 consecutive verbs: 

داشتم، می‌رفتم، دیدم، گرفته، نشسته، گفتم، بذار، بپرسم، ببینم، می‌آد، نمی‌آد، دیدم، می‌گه، نمی‌خوام، بیام، می‌خوام، برم، بگیرم، بخوابم!

which means, I was heading and I saw she/he is sitting, I thought to ask to see whether he would come or wouldn't come, I figure out "I don't want to come, and I want to go get some sleep" he said!

The following example of serialization comes from the Nupe language from Nigeria:

The two verbs bé and lá appear consecutively, with no linking word (like "and") or anything else to indicate that one verb is subordinate to the other. The subject, "Musa", is understood to apply to both verbs. In this example, the second verb also has a direct object. Note that in the English version given, the second verb is translated by an infinitive, "to take", which is marked as subordinate to the first verb.

Depending on the language, the shared subject may be marked on both verbs or only one. In most of the examples, it is marked only once. However, in the following example from the Baré, in the Upper Amazon, the first person singular subject ("I") is marked twice:

A similar construction is also found in most varieties of dialectal Arabic. The following example is from Lebanese Arabic:

As a rule, serial verbs cannot be marked independently for categories such as tense, aspect and mood. Either all of the verbs are marked for the same features, or a sole marker is shared by all of them. In the Hindi   (literally, phone pick-up say (PAST)), "picked up the phone and said", only the second verb is marked as past tense, but both are understood to refer to the past. In the following example, from the West African Ewe, both verbs appear in their perfective form:

Similarly,  ("jump in") in which tobi is from tobu ("jump"), and komu means "go in";  ("be completed"), where deki is from dekiru ("be able to be done") and agaru means "rise, be offered". No arguments can come between the two verbs in this construction (in contrast to those described in the following section).

In the case of negation, only one negator can be applied to the whole serial construction, as in the following Baré example:

In Chinese, as in Southeast Asian languages, when a transitive verb is followed by an intransitive verb, the object of the combined verb may be understood as the object of the first verb and the subject of the second:  "the tiger bit Zhang to death", where Zhang is understood as the direct object of yǎo ("bite") but as the subject of sǐ ("die"). In the equivalent construction in Hindi, the one who dies would be the tiger, not Zhang.  (See Chinese grammar for more.)

In the following example from Maonan, a language spoken in southwestern China, up to ten verbs co-occur in a sentence coding a single event without any linking words, coordinating conjunctions or any other markings:

Examples with intervening elements between verbs 
In some languages that have verb serialization, the verbs must appear consecutively with nothing intervening. In other languages, however, it is possible for arguments, normally the object of one of the verbs, to come in between the serialized verbs. The resulting construction is a sequence of verb phrases rather than of plain verbs. The following example is from the Nigerian Yoruba:

The object of the first verb intervenes between the verbs, resulting in two consecutive verb phrases, the first meaning "took the book", the second "came". As before, the subject ("he" in this case) is understood to apply to both verbs. The combined action of taking the book and coming can be translated as "bringing" the book.

A serial verb construction may be used to introduce an actant ("money" in the following example, from Akan of West Africa): 

In Japanese also, strings of verb phrases can be created, often denoting events that are related causally or in time. Such strings may be translated into English by using "and", "while", "(in order) to" or other connectives, but some may have a more compact translation, as in the following example (from Hayao Miyazaki's Mononoke Hime) in which the actions of "following" and "coming" are simultaneous:

The following sentence from Mandarin Chinese can be considered to contain four verb phrases in sequence:

In Chinese, however, there is often no clear distinction between serial verb phrases and prepositional phrases. The first three "verbs" in the above sentence may alternatively be regarded as prepositions (this applies particularly to words like cóng which do not normally appear as independent verbs). Words used in that way in Chinese and in some other languages are commonly referred to as coverbs.

Contrast with compound verbs 
A distinction is sometimes made between serial verbs and compound verbs (also known as complex predicates). In a compound verb, the first element (verb or noun) generally carries most of the semantic load, while the second element, often called a vector verb (light verb) or explicator verb, provides fine distinctions (such as speaker attitude or grammatical aspect) and carries the inflection (markers of tense, mood and agreement). The first element may be a verb in conjunctive participle form, or as in Hindi and Punjabi, a bare verbstem). For example, in Hindi, in the second example below, लिया (liyā) (from the verb लेना lenā "to take") is a vector verb that indicates a completed action which is done for one's own benefit, and खा (khā) "eat" is the main or primary verb. In the third example below, डाला (ḍālā) (from the verb डालना ḍālnā "to put" or "to insert") is the vector verb, which indicates recklessness, gruesomeness, or an unwanted action. Both खा लिया (khā liyā) and खा डाला (khā ḍālā) alternate with the corresponding perfective form of the main verb (in this case, खाया khāyā "ate") under partly specifiable semantic and pragmatic conditions.

Negating the compound verbs in the indicative mood usually suppresses the vector verb in favor of their non-compound counterparts. This following sentence makes use of the vector verb लेना (lenā) "to take", which is dropped in the negative: 

However, compound verbs in the subjunctive mood retain the vector verbs when negated.

See also 
 Genitive construction

References

Sources 
Aikhenvald, Alexandra Y. and R.M.W. Dixon. 2006. Serial Verb Constructions: a cross-linguistic typology. (Explorations in Linguistic Typology, 2.) Oxford: Oxford University Press. 
Crowley, Terry. 2002. Serial Verbs in Oceanic: A Descriptive Typology. Oxford: Oxford University Press.
 Haspelmath, Martin. 2016. The serial verb construction: Comparative concept and cross-linguistic generalizations. Language and Linguistics 17(3). 291–319. DOI:http://doi.org/10.1177/2397002215626895.

External links
 Akan.org Teleteaching course, serial verbs subsection
 SIL LinguaLink on Serial Verbs

Syntactic entities
Verb types
Grammatical construction types